Comunidad Filmin S.L., doing business as Filmin, is a Spanish subscription video on demand streaming service, primarily dedicated to streaming independent films, as well as a production company and film distributor. The company headquarters is located in Barcelona.

History 
Founded by Juan Carlos Tous, José Antonio De Luna and Jaume Ripoll, the company was created in 2007. The platform partnered with distribution companies such as Golem, Tornasol, Wanda, El Deseo, Continental, Vértigo, and—later—Avalon. Owing to the special authorization from the ICAA,  became the first Spanish film simultaneously released in theatres and online (on Filmin) in 2008. The pay-subscription service began in 2010.

In 2020 the investment funds Nazca Capital and Seaya Ventures (stakeholder in Cabify and Glovo) acquired a 51% of the company shares. As of 2021, the platform had 15,000 titles, most of them consisting of European films (65%).

The platform released its first original series, Doctor Portuondo, in October 2021.

Awards

References 

1997 establishments in Spain
Subscription video on demand services
Companies based in Barcelona
Internet technology companies of Spain